Gemixystus leptos is a species of sea snail, a marine gastropod mollusk in the family Muricidae, the murex snails or rock snails.

Description
The shells of Gemixystus leptos are spinose and delicate, extending up to 5.3mm in length. The spire of G. leptos shells is higher and has comparatively narrower spire whorls in comparison to other members of the genus Gemixystus.

Distribution
This marine species occurs in the Coral Sea, off New Caledonia, the Chesterfield Islands and off Australia (Queensland).

References
 Houart R. (1995).The Trophoninae (Gastropoda: Muricidae) of the New Caledonia region''. In: P. Bouchet (ed.) Résultats des Campagnes Musorstom, volume 14. Mémoires du Muséum National d'Histoire Naturelle. 167: 459–498 page(s): 490, figs 28–29, 86–89, 134–136
 Houart R. & Héros V. (2019). The genus Gemixystus Iredale, 1929 (Gastropoda: Muricidae: Trophoninae) in New Caledonia with the description of two new species and some notes on the genus in the Indo-West Pacific. Novapex. 20(1-2): 1-12.

External links
 Houart, R. 2004. A review of Gemixystus Iredale, 1929 (Gastropoda: Muricidae) from Australia and New Zealand. Novapex 5(2): 1–27
 MNHN, Paris: holotype

Gastropods described in 1995
Gemixystus